Aeginopsis is a genus of deep sea hydrozoan of the family Aeginidae. It is monotypic, with the single species Aeginopsis laurentii

Habitat 
Found in arctic and sub-arctic waters, and is usually found on shelves, less commonly in offshore waters, but no deeper then 500 m.

References 

Monotypic cnidarian genera
Solmundaeginidae
Hydrozoan genera